Ethmia lapidella is a moth in the family Depressariidae. It is found in India, Japan, China and Taiwan.

The forewings are overlaid with black spots on a grey background. There are ten spots and one small group of black scales. The hindwings are bright grey, but the marginal area is somewhat darker. There are two generations per year with adults on wing from March to May and from September to October.

The larvae feed on Ehretia resinosa.

References

Moths described in 1880
lapidella
Moths of Japan